Sunniside is a village in the Metropolitan Borough of Gateshead, which is located around  from Newcastle upon Tyne. Prior to the creation of the county of Tyne and Wear in 1974, it was part of Whickham Urban District, which in turn formed a part of County Durham.

Sunniside has a busy Front Street, with a collection of pubs, shops, and amenities. The village is surrounded mainly by farmland, with plantations of trees to the east, whilst also neighbouring the villages of Byermoor, Marley Hill and Whickham.

The village is mostly housing, with older terraced properties situated near to the shops, and large housing estates built from the 1960s onward radiating from this area. It has a large park to the north of the village, next to Burnthouse Lane.

Attractions near to the village include Beamish Museum and Tanfield Railway.

The A692 road runs directly through the centre of the village and is used by many transport companies as a direct route to the town of Consett: this road carries some of the heaviest traffic through the borough of Gateshead daily.

There have been a lot of private housing developments in the village of Sunniside, between 2017 and 2021, leading to increases in population and traffic.

Sunniside has one of the highest rates of community council tax in the country (including London)

Demography
The data below shows that 51.4% of the population in Whickham South and Sunniside are female, which is above the national average , as well as being above average within the Metropolitan Borough of Gateshead .

A total of 2.6% of the population were from a black, Asian and minority ethnic (BAME) group in Whickham South and Sunniside. This figure is significantly lower than that of the average in the Metropolitan Borough of Gateshead , as well as the national average .

Data from the Office for National Statistics found that the average life expectancy in Whickham South and Sunniside is 82.3 years for men, and 86.2 years for women. These statistics compare very favourably, when compared to the average life expectancy in the North East of England, of 77.4 and 81.4 years, for men and women respectively.

Car ownership is significantly higher than the average within the Metropolitan Borough of Gateshead , as well as the national average , with a total of 82.2% of households in Whickham South and Sunniside having access to at least one car.

Education
In terms of primary education, students attend the nearby Clover Hill Primary School and Fellside Primary School in Whickham, as well as Sacred Heart Primary School in Byermoor.

Whickham School and Sports College provides secondary education in the area, along with Emmanuel College in Lobley Hill and St. Thomas More Catholic School in Blaydon.

Governance
Whickham South and Sunniside is a local council ward in the Metropolitan Borough of Gateshead.

, the ward is served by three councillors: John McClury, Jonathan Charles Wallace and Marilynn Ord.

The village is in the parliamentary constituency of Gateshead, and is served by Labour Party Member of Parliament (MP), Ian Mearns.

Transport

Air

Bus
Sunniside is served by eight buses per hour to Newcastle upon Tyne and Stanley, with six buses per hour to Gateshead and three buses per hour to Consett, as well as a half-hourly service to Whickham and Metrocentre.

Rail
The nearest National Rail stations are located at MetroCentre and Newcastle.

Road
The main road through the village is the A692, which runs  from the A68 at Castleside to the A1 at Lobley Hill.

References

External links
 

Villages in Tyne and Wear
Gateshead